Daniel Harrington or Dan Harrington may refer to:

Daniel C. Harrington (1849–?), American sailor who won the Medal of Honor for his actions in the American Civil War
Daniel J. Harrington (1940–2014), American Roman Catholic theologian and academic
 Dan Harrington (born 1945), professional poker player
 Dan Harrington (politician) (born 1938), Montana state senator
 Dan Harrington (footballer) (born 1953), former Australian rules footballer